Daniel Paul Rader (August 24, 1879 – July 19, 1938) was an influential evangelist in the Chicago area during the early 20th century and was America's first nationwide radio preacher. He was senior pastor of the renowned Moody Church from 1915 to 1921 and was also the second president of the Christian and Missionary Alliance.

In 1925, Rader, who had been holding revival camp meetings in Tower Lakes, IL, bought 367 acres there, with plans for summer cottages, a radio station and a tabernacle that could accommodate 5000 hearers. But he sold the land the next year to a residential developer after building only a few cottages. He also started a Tabernacle in Los Angeles, California, in 1929. The daily Tabernacle radio broadcasts featured singers accompanied by pianist Rudy Atwood.

Rader wrote several hymns during his lengthy career, one of which was "Only Believe", a personal favorite of singer Elvis Presley. Presley recorded the song in 1970 for his album Love Letters from Elvis and it was subsequently released as a single in 1971, where it spent two weeks on the chart, peaking at #95. "Only Believe" was also the theme song of William Branham's campaigns as well as a favorite of Smith Wigglesworth.

Rev. Rader also published a novel, Big Bug, which was about Hollywood as the sin center of America. Rader's great-nephew, also named Paul Rader, served as General of the Salvation Army, and President of Asbury University.

Rev. Rader attended Hamline University, where in 1901 he helped found the Beta Omicron Sigma Kappa social fraternity, or the Brotherhood of Scholarly Knights. This went on to become the Alpha chapter of Beta Kappa fraternity, which after the merger with Theta Chi fraternity became Beta Kappa chapter of Theta Chi.

Biography
Paul Rader Portrait of an Evangelist (1879-1938)

See also
Moody Church
Chicago Gospel Tabernacle
Christian and Missionary Alliance

References

Rader, Paul.  Big Bug. Fleming H. Revell Co.: New York, 1932.

External links
Cyber Hymnal Biography
Rev. Paul Rader's Life Story in His Own Words

1879 births
1938 deaths
Evangelists
American evangelicals

Burials at Forest Lawn Memorial Park (Glendale)